The 2017–18 Bonaire League or known locally as the 2017–18 Kampionato is the 48th season of the Bonaire League, the top-tier football league in Bonaire. The regular season began on 19 November 2017, and the final was played on 26 August 2018.

Regular season

Kaya 6

Kaya 4

Final

Top scorers

References 

Bonaire League seasons
Bonaire
football
football